Oberlauringen, with 680 inhabitants is part of the municipality Stadtlauringen in the district of Schweinfurt in Lower Franconia, Bavaria, Germany.

History 
On May 1, 1978, the previously independent municipality was incorporated into the Stadtlauringen market.

References

Lower Franconia
Populated places in Bavaria